The Audi Sport TT Cup was a one-make super car racing series by Audi based in Germany first held in 2015. Audi Sport TT Cup cars based on the Audi TT. It was a support series for the Deutsche Tourenwagen Masters, replacing the Volkswagen Scirocco R-Cup. For the 2018 season, Abt Sportsline was scheduled to take over the organization of the championship however due to lack of entries, Audi Sport Abt TT Cup were cancelled and thus replaced by Audi Sport Seyffarth R8 LMS Cup.

Specifications
Engine displacement: Volkswagen-Audi EA113  DOHC inline-4
Gearbox: 6-speed S-tronic paddle shift gearbox
Weight: 
Power output:  with push-to-pass
Fuel: Aral Ultimate Racing 102 RON unleaded
Fuel capacity: 
Fuel delivery: Gasoline direct injection
Aspiration: Single-turbocharged
Length: 
Width: 
Steering: Electric progressive steering

Champions

References

External links

 
Recurring sporting events established in 2015
2015 establishments in Germany
Recurring sporting events disestablished in 2017